Dendrelaphis calligastra, also called green tree snake and northern green tree snake is a colubrid snake native to Indonesia, Papua New Guinea and Australia.
It is a slender, large-eyed, non-venomous, diurnal snake, which grows up to 1.2 m in length and is greenish, brown, or greyish above with a cream or yellow belly.

This common snake is harmless, and readily recognised due to its cream to yellow belly and pronounced wide dark facial stripe passing across the eye.

Etymology 
Dendrelaphis: 'tree Elaphe', after another genus of colubrid snakes.
calligastra: 'beautiful-bellied'.

Habitat 

Northern tree snakes are found in tropical north Queensland, from Paluma to Cooktown and eastern Cape York Peninsula, as well as southern Papua New Guinea. They live in a wide variety of habitats, including rainforest, urban and farmed regions, and open forest. They often bask in the leaf canopy of small bushes and trees and can escape very quickly through the canopy.

Diet 
They eat frogs and reptiles.

Distribution 

Dendrelaphis calligastra is common in Queensland's northern tropics and eastern Cape York Peninsula.

Breeding 

The northern tree snake lays eggs in clutches from five to seven, with one female recorded as laying 11 eggs in January.

References

Further reading 
 Queensland Museum (2000). Wildlife of Tropical North Queensland: Cooktown to Mackay. 
Ehmann (1992). Encyclopedia of Australian Animals: Reptiles. Harald Ehmann. The Australian Museum. Angus & Robertson.  (Reptiles).

External links 
 photo, description, distribution map
 photo gallery

Colubrids
Snakes of Australia
Reptiles of Papua New Guinea
Least concern biota of Oceania
Reptiles described in 1867
Taxa named by Albert Günther
calligastra
Snakes of New Guinea
Taxobox binomials not recognized by IUCN